Shahidabad Rural District is a rural district (dehestan) in Central District, Avaj County, Qazvin Province, Iran. At the 2006 census, its population was 7,447, in 1,813 families.  The rural district has 16 villages.

References 

Rural Districts of Qazvin Province
Avaj County